The 2017 CONCACAF Futsal Club Championship was the second edition of the CONCACAF Futsal Club Championship. It was played from 21 to 26 August 2017 at the Universidad Pedagógica Nacional Francisco Morazán in Tegucigalpa, Honduras.

Teams
A total of eight teams, representing eight CONCACAF member associations, were invited to enter the competition.

Draw
The draw was held on 21 July 2017, 12:00 UTC−4, at the CONCACAF headquarters in Miami Beach, Florida. The eight teams were drawn into two groups of four. UPNFM (Honduras) were seeded into Group A as the host team, and Grupo Line Futsal (Costa Rica) were seeded into Group B as the team from the participating association with the best result in the previous edition in 2014. The remaining teams were drawn into the two groups, with the restriction that no more than two teams from the same zone could be drawn into the same group.

Squads
Each team had to submit a squad of 12 players, including a minimum of two goalkeepers (Regulations XVI.).

Group stage
The schedule of the tournament was announced on 24 July 2017.

The top two teams of each group advanced to the semi-finals. The teams were ranked according to points (3 points for a win, 1 point for a draw, 0 points for a loss). If tied on points, tiebreakers were applied in the following order (Regulations XXI. 5. 1.):
Results in head-to-head matches between tied teams (points, goal difference, goals scored);
Goal difference in all matches;
Goals scored in all matches;
Drawing of lots.

All times CST (UTC−6).

Group A

Group B

Knockout stage
In the semi-finals, third place match and final, extra time and penalty shoot-out were used to decide the winner if necessary.

Bracket

Semifinals

Third place match

Final

Top goalscorers

References

External links
Futsal, CONCACAF.com

2017
2017 in futsal
Futsal Club Championship
2017
August 2017 sports events in North America